Margaret Fane (born Beatrice Florence Osborn, 10 January 1887 – 1962) was an Australian novelist and poet. Her short stories were published in the Sydney Mail, the Sydney Morning Herald, The Bulletin and the Australian Woman's Mirror. She co-wrote The Happy Vagabond with Hilary Lofting (1928).

Early life
She was born in Camberwell, a suburb of Melbourne, to English and Spanish Australian parents. Her father was born in British Ceylon, and arrived in Australia as a child. As a girl, Fane had aspired to be an opera singer like her mother. However, under the influence of her father, who liked literature, she became well versed in the works of Charles Dickens and William Shakespeare, eventually becoming a writer herself.

Personal life
In 1912, Fane married David McKee Wright (1869–1928), editor of The Bulletin. She gave birth to their four sons. She divorced Wright in 1918. Fane remarried, marrying Hilary Lofting (1881–1939, the eldest brother of Hugh Lofting). Her second marriage stimulated Fane's creative impulses. She and Hilary published short stories in various publications, including The Sydney Mail, The Sydney Morning Herald and other magazines.

She died in 1962, in Brisbane, Australia.

Work
 The Happy Vagabond (1928, co-authored with Hilary Lofting)

See also
 List of Australian novelists

Notes

References
 Michael Sharkey / Romantic and modern: country and city in the short stories of Margaret Fane and Hilary Lofting, Journal of the Association for the Study of Australian Literature, vol. 12, no. 3 (2012)

External links
 
  Margaret Fane at AustLit: The Australian Literature Resource

1887 births
1962 deaths
20th-century Australian novelists
Australian women poets
Australian women novelists
Writers from Melbourne
20th-century Australian women writers
20th-century Australian poets
People from Camberwell, Victoria